The 68th Infantry Division was a formation of the German army during World War II. It was formed in 1939, and was initially committed to the German invasion of Poland. It took part in the Battle of France in 1940, and then Operation Barbarossa in 1941 as part of Army Group South. The 68th remained in southern Russia until refitted in Poland in early 1944. Returned to action the 68th fought for rest of the war in the East, in Russia, Slovakia, in the defence of Germany until finally surrendering to the Soviets in Czechoslovakia.

Commanding officers
 Generalleutnant Georg Braun, 26 August 1939 - 14 November 1941
 Generalleutnant Robert Meißner, 16 November 1941 - 26 January 1943
 Generalleutnant Hans Schmidt, 27 January 1943 - 25 October 1943
 Generalleutnant Paul Scheuerpflug, 25 October 1943 - 8 May 1945

Notable people
 Sniper Bruno Sutkus

External links
 68th Division lexikon der wehrmacht - German language
 68th Division Axis history site
 Organisation of 2nd Wave divisions 1939
 Organisation of 2nd Wave divisions 1940

Published works
 

0*068
Military units and formations established in 1939
1939 establishments in Germany
Military units and formations disestablished in 1945